The Tumulus of Montefortini  is an Etruscan tomb near Comeana, Tuscany, central Italy, which is believed to date from the 7th century BC.

The tumulus is an oval burial mound 80 metres long and 11 metres high, which houses two tombs. Excavations began in 1966 and the finds are displayed in the museum of Artimino.

References

External links
 Montalbano website
 Official website for tourism in Tuscany on Tumulus of Montefortini

Archaeological sites in Tuscany
Montefortini
Buildings and structures in Tuscany
Montefortini
Tourist attractions in Tuscany
Carmignano